In Greek mythology, Menippe (Ancient Greek:  Menippê meaning 'the courageous mare' or 'sipper') and Metioche were daughters of Orion. They feature in a brief myth about human sacrifice.

Mythology 
After Orion was killed they were brought up by their mother, and Athena taught them the art of weaving and Aphrodite gave them beauty. Once their homeland Aonia at the base of Mt. Helicon was struck by a plague, and the oracle of Apollo Gortynius, when consulted, ordered the inhabitants to propitiate the two Erinnyes by the sacrifice of two maidens, who were to offer themselves to death of their own accord. Menippe and Metioche offered themselves; they thrice invoked the infernal gods, and killed themselves with their shuttles. Persephone and Hades metamorphosed them into comets. The Aonians erected them a sanctuary near Orchomenus, where a propitiatory sacrifice was offered to them every year by youths and maidens. The Aeolians called these maidens Koronides. In Ovid's recount of the tale, the daughters of Orion remain unnamed and sacrifice themselves for no distinctly given reason (although a withered tree and gaunt goats on a barren field are mentioned and indicate the presence of a plague): From their ashes, two youths arise and lead the funeral train for their "mothers" and instead of Menippe and Metioche, the youths are referred to as "Coroni".

See also 

 Iphigenia
 Binding of Isaac
 Human sacrifice

Footnotes

Notes

References 
 Antoninus Liberalis, The Metamorphoses of Antoninus Liberalis translated by Francis Celoria (Routledge 1992). Online version at the Topos Text Project.
 Apollodorus, The Library with an English Translation by Sir James George Frazer, F.B.A., F.R.S. in 2 Volumes, Cambridge, MA, Harvard University Press; London, William Heinemann Ltd. 1921. . Online version at the Perseus Digital Library. Greek text available from the same website.
 
 
 Publius Ovidius Naso, Metamorphoses translated by Brookes More (1859-1942). Boston, Cornhill Publishing Co. 1922. Online version at the Perseus Digital Library.
 Publius Ovidius Naso, Metamorphoses. Hugo Magnus. Gotha (Germany). Friedr. Andr. Perthes. 1892. Latin text available at the Perseus Digital Library.

External links 
 MENIPPE AND METIOCHE in The Theoi Project

Women in Greek mythology
Metamorphoses into terrain in Greek mythology
Characters in Greek mythology
Textiles in folklore
Deeds of Athena
Deeds of Aphrodite
Persephone
Metamorphoses into the opposite sex in Greek mythology
Metamorphoses characters